The Center for Economic Reforms Analysis and Communication (Azerbaijani: İqtisadi İslahatların Təhlili və Kommunikasiya Mərkəzi) is a legal entity that suggests proposals in order to achieve economic reforms by analyzing the analytical data which is acquired through researches on macro and microeconomic levels. The Center ensures sustainable economic development of in Azerbaijan. It is located in the capital of Azerbaijan, Baku. Vusal Gasimli is the executive director of the center since May 2, 2016.

History 
The Center for Analysis Economic Reforms and Communication was established according to the Presidential Decree 879 dated April 20, 2016.

The legislative base of the Center is the Constitution of Azerbaijan Republic, the international agreements signed by the government of Azerbaijan, Law “On Public Legal Persons”, decrees and orders of the President of Azerbaijan, resolutions and orders of the Cabinet of Azerbaijan, legal acts, Charter, etc.

The activities of the Center are overseen by the President of Azerbaijan.

Duties of the Center 

 Analyzing the strategy of Azerbaijan based on its economic development ensuring its effective application;
 Looking into details of the economic condition of the country and anticipating expected economic fluctuations by taking into account the current financial situation;
 Taking reformatory measures that are part of the projects realized by various organizations (including local and international credit organizations) in different parts of the economy;
 Exploring similar internationally proved practices for the purpose of reinforcing the economic potential of the country, attracting investors (local and foreign), decreasing oil dependency, and establishing a favorable investment environment.
 Accumulating data on the consequences of economic reforms and development tendency of the mutual trust between public and private sectors;
 Providing information to the entrepreneurs and publicity about the economic reforms that already implemented, and their pros and cons for the economy and investment environment;
 Giving analysis, research, and survey results to the various government authorities;
 Protecting the public and commercial secrets, including the confidentiality regime;
 Establishing international ties and cooperating based on those ties;
 Making aware of the ordinary citizens about its work, setting up a webpage and constantly upgrade information allowed to be publicized under the Law “On Access to Information” of Azerbaijan Republic;

Rights of the Center 

 Participating in the process of drafting legal acts envisaging the implementation of economic reforms;
 Organizing conferences, meetings, symposiums and other events related to its activity;
 Performing the position initiator and customer of researches at research centers;
 Applying the experiences of experts and specialists during the implementation of its duties based on contracts;
 Looking for the existing international practices of relevant foreign state bodies in order to apply them in its activities;
 Exercising other rights defined by the law and the acts of the President of Azerbaijan.

Management 
The Center is run by a supervisory board and executive director. The exercise the powers of the founder in the Center is entrusted to the President of Azerbaijan and the Cabinet of Ministers of the Republic of Azerbaijan. The President approves the charter and financial statements, defines the fund, and reorganizes and liquidates the Center. The Cabinet of Ministers establishes economic societies, as well as approves appointment and dismissal of heads of departments, branches and representative offices.

Supervisory Board 
In accordance with Decree No. 879 dated April 20, 2016, the overall management of the Center is carried out by a Supervisory Board that consists of 3 people. The Chairman and other members of the Board are appointed and dismissed by the President of the Republic of Azerbaijan. The term of office of the members of the Board is 5 years. Natig Amirov, assistant to the President of the Republic of Azerbaijan for Economic Reforms, is the chairman of the Supervisory Board.

Inam Karimov and Vusal Huseynov are the members of the Board.

Executive Power 
After the decision of the Supervisory Board of the Center for Analysis of Economic Reforms and Communication dated May 2, 2016, Vusal Gasimli was appointed Executive director of the Center for Economic Reforms Analysis and Communication. Executive director is accountable for everyday activities of the Center; he executes the resolutions of the Board and supervise other internal matters based on the rules.

See also 
Azerbaijan
Economy of Azerbaijan
Center for Strategic Studies under the President of Azerbaijan

References

External links 
 Official website

Government agencies of Azerbaijan
Economy of Azerbaijan